Koji Miyamoto is a Japanese professional wrestling historian and writer, best known for his work on Lou Thesz. He has authored sixteen books.

Awards
 National Wrestling Hall of Fame
 James C. Melby Award (2018)

See also
 James C. Melby

References

External links
 National Wrestling Hall of Fame profile

Professional wrestling historians
21st-century Japanese historians
Year of birth missing (living people)
Living people